TGK PG is an automated cargo spacecraft project to replace Progress-MS as the Russian logistic vehicle to the ISS. It was requested for development to take advantage of the increased lift capacity of the Soyuz-2.1b. The initial development contract was awarded to RSC Energia by Roscosmos on December 11, 2015. The spacecraft is not expected to fly before 2020.

Spacecraft description
Born out of the need to reduce the flights to the ISS from 2018 onward, it was designed as a radical departure from the Progress design. It would incorporate concepts and technologies developed from the Orel and Progress-MS projects. One critical characteristic would be a 370 days on-orbit design life, compared to the 210 days of the Progress and Soyuz. This would allow less ships to be launched per year while maintaining a full complement on the station.
It would consist of a service module on the aft, an unpressurized propellant cluster of six tanks on the center, a pressurized module with docking adapter on the fore and a truss structure connecting all the parts. It would use the reaction control system of the Progress-MS and an orbital manoeuvring rocket engine already developed for another spacecraft. The new design would have a single deposit of propellant that could be used by the spacecraft or to refuel the space station.

See also

 Comparison of space station cargo vehicles
 Progress spacecraft – an expendable cargo vehicle currently in use by the Russian Federal Space Agency
 Automated Transfer Vehicle – a retired expendable cargo vehicle used by the ESA
 Cygnus spacecraft – an expendable cargo vehicle developed by Orbital Sciences Corporation under American CRS program, currently in use.
 H-II Transfer Vehicle – a　retired expendable cargo vehicle used by JAXA
 Dragon 2 cargo spacecraft - a reusable cargo vehicle developed by SpaceX, under American CRS program, currently in use.
 Dream Chaser Cargo System - a cargo variant of the reusable SNC's spaceplane

References

External links 
 RussianSpaceWeb TGK PG

Proposed spacecraft
Cargo spacecraft
Space program of Russia